Ali Ammar (14 May 1930 – 8 October 1957), better known by his nickname Ali la Pointe, was an Algerian revolutionary fighter and guerrilla leader of the National Liberation Front who fought for Algerian independence against the French colonial regime, during the Battle of Algiers.

Ali lived a life of petty crime and was serving a two-year prison sentence when the Algerian War (1954 to 1962) began. Recruited in the notorious Barberousse prison by FLN militants, he became one of their most trusted and loyal lieutenants in Algiers. On 28 December 1956, he was suspected of killing the Mayor of Boufarik, Amédée Froger.

In 1957 French paratroopers led by Colonel Yves Godard systematically isolated and eliminated the FLN leadership in Algiers.  Godard's extortion methods included torture.  In June, la Pointe led teams setting explosives in street lights near bus stops and bombing a dance club that killed 17 people.

Saadi Yacef ordered the leadership to hide in separate addresses within the Casbah. After Yacef's capture, la Pointe and three companions, Hassiba Ben Bouali, Mahmoud "Hamid" Bouhamidi and 'Petit Omar', held out in hiding until 8 October. Tracked down by paras acting on a tip-off from an informer, Ali La Pointe was given the chance to surrender but refused, whereupon he, his companions and the house in which he was hiding were bombed by French paratroopers; 20 Algerians were killed in the blast.

Biography 
Ali Ammar was born on 14 May 1930 in Miliana, Algeria to a poor family. The family's financial situation did not allow him to attend school. His nickname "La Pointe" comes from the Point district in Miliana. While being imprisoned for the first time at the age of thirteen, he learned masonry. In 1945, he became known in Algeria for playing tchi-tchi, a type of gambling game scam, then as a pimp and acquired a sort of prestige.

In 1954, when the Algerian War broke out, he escaped from the Barberousse prison (Prison de Barberousse) where he was serving a two-year sentence for attempted murder. FLN, Front de libération nationale (National Liberation Front), militants explained to him that Algeria was a victim of colonialism and recruited him to their cause. He later escaped again after being transferred to a prison in Damiette, now known as Aïn Deheb.  He returned to Algiers and made contact a few months later with Yacef Saadi.

Activity within the FLN 

In late 1955, Ali la Pointe was introduced to Yacef Saâdi, who was the deputy of Larbi Ben M'hidi, the head of the FLN for Algiers (aka Zone autonome d'Alger (autonomous zone of Algiers) during the Algerian War. Yacef Saâdi "decided to test him", trusting him with the execution of a snitch on the evening of their meeting. Recruited, according to Marie-Monique Robin for his "formidable qualities as a killer", he became, according to Christopher Cradock and M.L.R. Smith, "the chief assassin" for FLN.

He was notably responsible for what was referred to as a "line up of the Casbah underworld with the nationalist terrorist movement" from an article by The New York Times. After some figures of the local underworld suspected of being informants were executed, such as Rafai Abdelkader, Said Bud Abbot and Hocine Bourtachi, he "sowed terror" in the casbah, according to Marie-Monique Robin by applying "revolutionary instructions, such as not allowing drinking alcohol or smoking".

On 30 September 1956, two bombs exploded in two public places in Algiers, the Milk Bar and the Cafétaria, killing four and wounding fifty-two. They were planted by Zohra Drif and Samia Lakhdari respectively, while a third bomb, planted by Djamila Bouhired at the Air France terminal, did not explode. These events mark the beginning of the “Battle of Algiers”. These three women were, along with Djamila Bouazza, the ones who planted a bomb on 26 January 1957 at the Coq Hardi brewery, part of the “bombs network” headed by Yacef Saâdi, assisted by Ali la Pointe.

Legacy 
He was portrayed by Brahim Haggiag in the film The Battle of Algiers.

References 

1930 births
1957 deaths
Members of the National Liberation Front (Algeria)
People of the Algerian War
Algerian guerrillas killed in action
Deaths by explosive device
People from Miliana
Algerian revolutionaries